Akulinovka is a rural locality (a selo) and the administrative center of Akulinovskoye Rural Settlement, Borisovsky District, Belgorod Oblast, Russia. The population was 462 as of 2010. There are 6 streets.

Geography 
Akulinovka is located 22 km northwest of Borisovka (the district's administrative centre) by road. Kulinovka is the nearest rural locality.

References 

Rural localities in Borisovsky District